Edward Gilbert Holiday (26 September 1900 – 24 December 1978) was a Singaporean sailor. He competed at the 1956 Summer Olympics and the 1960 Summer Olympics.

References

External links
 

1900 births
1978 deaths
Singaporean male sailors (sport)
Olympic sailors of Singapore
Sailors at the 1956 Summer Olympics – Dragon
Sailors at the 1960 Summer Olympics – Dragon
People from Saint Peter Port
20th-century Singaporean people